Euryphrissa is a genus of moths in the family Sesiidae.

Species
Euryphrissa cambyses (Druce, 1884)
Euryphrissa chea (Druce, 1899)
Euryphrissa cladiiformis (Walker, 1856)
Euryphrissa croesiformis (Walker, 1856)
Euryphrissa fasciculipes (Walker, [1865])
Euryphrissa homotropha (Meyrick, 1921)
Euryphrissa infera (Meyrick, 1921)
Euryphrissa plumipes (Walker, [1865])
Euryphrissa pomponia (Le Cerf, 1911)
Euryphrissa senta (Druce, 1883)
Euryphrissa syngenica Zukowsky, 1936
Euryphrissa remipes (Butler, 1874)

References

Sesiidae